The Strongest Man in the World is a Canadian short documentary film, directed by Halya Kuchmij and released in 1980.

The film is a portrait of Mike Swistun, a circus performer from Manitoba who was billed as "The Strongest Man in the World" when he toured with Ringling Bros. and Barnum & Bailey Circus in the 1920s; after an injury ended his career in 1930, he returned to the town of Olha where his work included stints as a folk musician, a designer of Ukrainian Orthodox churches, and a chicken farmer.

The film won the Genie Award for Best Theatrical Short Film at the 2nd Genie Awards in 1981.

References

External links
 
 The Strongest Man in the World at the Winnipeg Film Group

1980 films
Best Theatrical Short Film Genie and Canadian Screen Award winners
Canadian short documentary films
1980 short films
Films shot in Manitoba
1980s short documentary films
1980s Canadian films
Ringling Bros. and Barnum & Bailey Circus